Konyukhovo is a rural locality (a village) in Krasnoplamenskoye Rural Settlement, Alexandrovsky District, Vladimir Oblast, Russia. The population was 7 as of 2010. There are 2 streets.

Geography 
Konyukhovo is located on the Dubna River, 23 km northwest of Alexandrov (the district's administrative centre) by road. Dubna is the nearest rural locality.

References 

Rural localities in Alexandrovsky District, Vladimir Oblast